David Bruce Payton (born c. 1952) was the Administrator of Tokelau from 17 October 2006 to 2009.

Payton joined the Ministry of Foreign Affairs in 1975, where he worked in the aid division assisting Niue. From 1977-79 he was posted the New Zealand High Commission in Nuku'alofa, Tonga. He also served as Senior Advisor to the Secretary-General for the International Conference on Population and Development as part of the United Nations Population Fund (from 1992-1994) based in New York. He was also on the New Zealand Delegation to the historic Rio Summit in 1993 led by New Zealand diplomat, Terence O'Brien. From 1997 to 2000 he was New Zealand Ambassador to Saudi Arabia, and from 2002 to 2006 Ambassador to the Netherlands.

He was appointed Administrator of Tokelau in October 2006.

He retired from the Ministry of Foreign Affairs and Trade (MFAT) in 2014 at the age of 62, after spending the last few years of his career (2011-2014) working in New York (for the second time) for the United Nations Development Programme (UNDP) on issues related to development in Small Island Developing States (SIDs).

References

1952 births
Living people
Administrators of Tokelau
New Zealand diplomats
Ambassadors of New Zealand to Saudi Arabia
Ambassadors of New Zealand to the Netherlands